Raul Andino is a virologist and professor in the Department of Microbiology and Immunology at the University of California, San Francisco. He is noted for leading a team of researchers that developed the first new oral polio vaccine in 50 years.

Early life and education
Raul Andino was born in 1957 in Argentina. He completed his master's degree in Biology in 1980 and his Ph.D. in Chemistry in 1986, both at the University of Buenos Aires.

Andino emigrated to the United States in the 1980s. He then went on to work as a postdoctoral researcher first at the Whitehead Institute for Biomedical Research from 1986 to 1991, then at Rockefeller University in the lab of David Baltimore from 1991 to 1992. He then joined the faculty of the University of California, San Francisco as an assistant professor. He was promoted to associate professor in 1999, then full professor in 2003.

Research
Raul Andino's research has long focused on poliovirus. Together with Andrew Macadam, Andino redesigned the polio vaccine so it can stop the virus from re-evolving. His research has expanded to other enteroviruses and host defenses against other RNA viruses. His group has also had a long-standing interest in RNA interference as an antiviral defense, and in the dynamics of viral evolution during infection and transmission.

Notable publications

Vignuzzi M, Stone JK... Andino R (2006). Quasispecies diversity determines pathogenesis through cooperative interactions in a viral population. Nature. 439(7074): pgs. 344-348
Gitlin L, Karelsky S, Andino R (2002). Short interfering RNA confers intracellular antiviral immunity in human cells. Nature. 418(6896): pgs. 430-434
Crotty S, Camerson SE, Andino R (2001). RNA virus error catastrophe: direct molecular test using ribavirin. Proceedings of the National Academy of Sciences of the United States of America. 98(12): pgs. 6895-6900
Gamarnik AV, Andino R (1998). Switch from translation to RNA replication in a positive-stranded RNA virus. Genes and Development. 12(15) pgs. 2293-2304
Andino R, Rieckhof GE... Baltimore D (1993). Poliovirus RNA synthesis utilizes an RNP complex formed around the 5'-end of the viral RNA. EMBO Journal. 12(9): pgs. 3587-3598

References

American virologists
1957 births
Living people
Polio
Fellows of the American Academy of Microbiology